Muhammed Furkan Özbek (born 24 January 2001) is a Turkish weightlifter. He won the gold medal in his event at the European Weightlifting Championships in 2021 and 2022.

Career 
In 2018, he won the gold medal in the men's youth 69 kg event at the European Youth Weightlifting Championships held in San Donato Milanese, Italy. He also won the gold medal in the 69 kg event at the 2018 Summer Youth Olympics held in Buenos Aires, Argentina.

In 2019, he won the gold medal in the men's junior 73kg event at the European Junior & U23 Weightlifting Championships in Bucharest, Romania. In 2021, he won the gold medal in his event at the Junior World Weightlifting Championships held in Tashkent, Uzbekistan.

Muhammed Furkan Özbek clinched three medals, including two golds, at the 2021 European Weightlifting Championships held in the Russian capital, Moscow. First won bronze in the men's 67-kilogram weight class at the European Weightlifting Championships. He lifted 145 kilograms in snatch. He then went on to claim two gold medals, lifting 178 kilograms in the clean and jerk, and 323 kilograms in total.

He competed in the men's 67 kg event at the 2020 Summer Olympics in Tokyo, Japan.

He won the gold medal in the men's 73 kg event at the 2022 European Weightlifting Championships held in Tirana, Albania. He lifted 149 kilograms in snatch, 190 kilograms in the clean and jerk, and 339 kilograms in total. He won the silver medal in the men's 73 kg Clean & Jerk event at the 2022 Mediterranean Games held in Oran, Algeria.

Major results

References

External links 
 

Living people
2001 births
Turkish male weightlifters
Weightlifters at the 2018 Summer Youth Olympics
Youth Olympic gold medalists for Turkey
European Weightlifting Championships medalists
Weightlifters at the 2020 Summer Olympics
Olympic weightlifters of Turkey
Competitors at the 2022 Mediterranean Games
Mediterranean Games silver medalists for Turkey
Mediterranean Games medalists in weightlifting
21st-century Turkish people